Adolph Huebsch (born in Szentmiklós, Hungary [now Liptovsky Mikulas, Slovakia], 18 September 1830; died in New York City, 10 October 1884) was a Hungarian-American Hebrew scholar and rabbi.

Biography
While a student, he participated in the Hungarian Revolution of 1848/9. After it was suppressed, he resumed his studies and officiated as rabbi in various towns. In 1861, he received the degree of Ph.D. from Prague University, and preached in that city for a short time.

In 1866 he was called to New York City as rabbi of a synagogue, where he preached until his death. Huebsch was a Talmudic and Semitic scholar of high attainments, a preacher of rare power, with a personality that charmed old and young. He was peculiarly successful in his ministry.

He published Gems from the Orient, a selection of Talmudic and oriental proverbs, and a volume of his sermons and addresses was issued in 1885.

Notes

References

External links
 
 

1830 births
1884 deaths
Hungarian rabbis
Rabbis from New York City
American people of Hungarian-Jewish descent
People of the Revolutions of 1848
Hungarian emigrants to the United States
Charles University alumni